Gilles Marguet (born 3 December 1967 in Pontarlier, Doubs) is a retired French biathlete.

He was born in Pontarlier. At the 2002 Winter Olympics in Salt Lake City, he won a bronze medal with the French relay team, in 4 × 7.5 km relay.

References

External links

1967 births
Living people
People from Pontarlier
French male biathletes
Olympic biathletes of France
Biathletes at the 2002 Winter Olympics
Olympic bronze medalists for France
Olympic medalists in biathlon
Biathlon World Championships medalists
Medalists at the 2002 Winter Olympics
Sportspeople from Doubs